Sempor is a district of Kebumen Regency, Central Java, Indonesia. Sempor District is approximately 29 km northwest of Kebumen City. It borders Mandiraja District to the north, Karanggayam and Karanganyar Districts to the east, Gombong and Buayan Districts to the south, and Rowokele District to the west.

As of 2010, Sempor has a population of 58,418. Sempor District consists of 16 villages, 74 rukun warga, and 368 rukun tetangga. The administrative center of Sempor District is Jatinegara Village.

Geography 
Sempor District is situated inside a valley within the South Serayu Mountains. The Sempor Reservoir is located in the center of the district.

Climate 
Sempor has a tropical rainforest climate (Af) with abundant rainfall year-round. It receives the most amount of precipitation in January, and the least in August. A summary of the annual temperature fluctuation and rainfall can be seen below:

Administrative divisions 
Sempor is divided into the following 16 villages:

 Bejiruyung
 Bonosari
 Donorojo
 Jatinegoro
 Kalibeji
 Kedungjati
 Kedungwringin
 Kenteng

 Pekuncen
 Sampang
 Selokerto
 Semali
 Sempor
 Sidoharum
 Somagede
 Tunjungseto

Education 
There are a total of 50 schools spread out across all the villages under Sempor. A breakdown of the 50 schools are shown in the table below:

See also 

 Sempor Dam

References 

Districts of Central Java
Districts of Indonesia